Sonja is a 1943 mystery drama film directed by Hampe Faustman and starring Birgit Tengroth, Åke Grönberg and Sture Lagerwall. It was shot at the Centrumateljéerna Studios in Stockholm. The film's sets were designed by the art director Harald Garmland.

Cast
 Birgit Tengroth as 	Sonja Larsson
 Åke Grönberg as 	Kurt Larsson
 Sture Lagerwall as 	Nick Berggren
 Elsie Albiin as 	Maj Larsson
 David Erikson as 	Kalle Lindgren 
 Bengt Ekerot as 	Bengt
 Gunn Wållgren as 	Sonja's Room-mate
 Barbro Fleege as 	Inga
 Lotten Olsson as Berta Lindgren

References

Bibliography 
 Sundholm, John . Historical Dictionary of Scandinavian Cinema. Scarecrow Press, 2012.

External links 
 

1943 films
Swedish drama films
1943 drama films
1940s Swedish-language films
Films directed by Hampe Faustman
Swedish black-and-white films
1940s Swedish films